The MRG-1 Ogonyok (МРГ-1 «Огонёк») is a Soviet remotely-controlled seven-barreled naval 55 mm grenade launcher adopted by the Soviet military in 1971. Its MRG-1 grenades are akin to miniature depth charges.

It has been replaced in the Russian military by the DP-65 grenade launcher, with ten tubes.

Users

See also
DP-64
DP-65

References

Grenade launchers of the Soviet Union

ru:МРГ-1 «Огонёк»